The Wedding Party 2: Destination Dubai is a 2017 Nigerian romantic comedy drama film directed by Niyi Akinmolayan. It is a sequel to The Wedding Party, which was released in December 2016. Principal photography for the film, which was shot in Lagos and Dubai, began in May 2017. It is currently the third highest grossing Nigerian film of all time.

Plot
Dozie's (Banky Wellington) elder brother, Nonso (Enyinna Nwigwe), has continued his romance with Deadre (Daniella Down), Dunni's (Adesua Etomi) bridesmaid. Nonso takes Deadre on a date in Dubai and proposes marriage by accident. After a disastrous traditional engagement ceremony in Lagos, Nonso's family and Deadre's aristocratic British family reluctantly agree to a wedding in Dubai.

Cast
Enyinna Nwigwe as Nonso Onwuka 
Daniella Down as Deadre Winston
Adesua Etomi as Dunni Onwuka 
Banky Wellington as Dozie Onwuka
Sola Sobowale as Mrs. Tinuade Coker 
Alibaba Akporobome as Engineer Bamidele Coker
Richard Mofe Damijo as Chief Felix Onwuka 
Iretiola Doyle as Lady Obianuju Onwuka 
Somkele Iyamah-Idhalama as Yemisi Disu
Ikechukwu Onunaku as Sola
Zainab Balogun as Wonu
Beverly Naya as Rosie
Afeez Oyetoro as Ayanmale
Chiwetalu Agu as Family Elder
Patience Ozokwor as Nonso's aunt
Chigul as Immigration Officer
Seyi Law as Custom Officer
Kunle Idowu as Harrison
Jumoke George as Iya Michael
 Regan Tetlow as the British MC

See also
 List of highest-grossing Nigerian films
 List of Nigerian films of 2017

References

External links
 
 

English-language Nigerian films
2017 films
Films about weddings
Films set in Lagos
Films shot in Lagos
Films shot in Dubai
2017 romantic comedy-drama films
Nigerian romantic comedy-drama films
2010s English-language films
2017 romantic comedy films
Nigerian sequel films